Humberston Academy (formerly Humberston Maths and Computing College) is a secondary school with academy status (DRET) based in Humberston (near Grimsby), North East Lincolnshire, England.

Admissions
It does not have a sixth form. It is situated on Humberston Avenue (B1219 - off the A1031) in the west of Humberston. Further to the west along the B1219 is the Tollbar Academy, and the school is less than one mile north of Lincolnshire (East Lindsey - Tetney and Holton-le-Clay, which has grammar schools). Directly to the west is the Humberston Country Club golf club.

History
The school opened in 1977 as Humberston Comprehensive School.

Until 1996 it was administered by Humberside Education Committee, based in Beverley. It gained specialist status in 2006.

In January 2009 it was placed in special measures. From September 2009, the school name changed from Humberston School to Humberston Maths and Computing College.

The school converted to academy status in 2011 and was renamed Humberston Academy. the school is now sponsored by the David Ross Education Trust.

Academic performance
In the last round of GCSE exams, the school gained the third best GCSE results for North East Lincolnshire.

Notable former pupils
 Keeley Donovan, BBC weather presenter
 Max Wright (English footballer), Grimsby Town footballer: Max Wright
 Harry Clifton (footballer, born 1998), Grimsby Town footballer: Harry Clifton

References

External links
 School website
 EduBase

Schools in Grimsby
Educational institutions established in 1977
Secondary schools in the Borough of North East Lincolnshire
1977 establishments in England
Academies in the Borough of North East Lincolnshire